Fernando Garcia (born 2 August 1994) is an Argentine motorcycle speedway rider. He rides as Coty Garcia in speedway leagues and is a former national champion of Argentina.

Biography
Born in Colonia Barón, Argentina, Garcia first rode a motor bike aged just six year old in his home town of Salazar. He rode in the final two rounds of the 2012 Speedway Under-21 World Championship.

He first came to British speedway when he signed for Berwick Bandits for the 2015 Premier League speedway season. The following season he signed for Scottish rivals Glasgow Tigers and improved his average by over two points and was a member of the Knockout Cup winning team. Redcar Bears signed him for the SGB Championship 2017.

During the 2018 season he rode for both Ipswich Witches and Edinburgh Monarchs before returning to Berwick for the 2019 season.

In 2020, he won the Argentine Championship.

References

Living people
1994 births
Argentine speedway riders
Berwick Bandits riders
Edinburgh Monarchs riders
Glasgow Tigers riders
Ipswich Witches riders
Redcar Bears riders